The 1991 Yale Bulldogs football team represented Yale University in the 1991 NCAA Division I-AA football season. The Bulldogs were led by 27th-year head coach Carmen Cozza, played their home games at the Yale Bowl and finished tied for fourth place in the Ivy League with a 4–3 record, 6–4 overall.

Schedule

References

Yale
Yale Bulldogs football seasons
Yale Bulldogs football